Antonio Dusi was an Italian painter of the Baroque period, mainly active in Brescia. He was initially a pupil of Antonio Paglia. One of his pupils was Santo Cattaneo.

References
 He painted the St Charles, Antony of Padua, Anne and Joseph venerate the Crucifix used for a main altarpiece in the church of Madonna del Lino, Brescia.

17th-century Italian painters
Italian male painters
Painters from Brescia
Year of death unknown
Italian Baroque painters
Year of birth unknown